National Route 161 is a national highway of Japan connecting Tsuruga, Fukui and Ōtsu, Shiga in Japan, with a total length of

See also

References

161
Roads in Fukui Prefecture
Roads in Shiga Prefecture